The 1969 Sudanese coup d'état was a successful coup, led by Colonel Gaafar Nimeiry, against the government of President Ismail al-Azhari. The coup signaled the end of Sudan's second democratic era, and saw the beginning of Nimeiry's 16 year rule.

Nimeiry's government would pursue a radical Arab nationalist and leftist program, bringing in a socialist program for social and economic development, including widespread nationalization of private property. His government would also push for an end to the First Sudanese Civil War, which by 1969 had been ongoing for nearly 14 years. In pursuing peace, the new government pushed for amnesty, and would declare regional autonomy for Southern Sudan on 9 June 1969.

Background

Coup
The coup began early on the morning of 25 May, and by 4:00 am the key installations in the Khartoum-Bahri-Omdurman area had been occupied and leading Sudanese Army generals arrested. At 7:00 am, Radio Omdurman broadcast recorded speeches by Nimeiry and Babiker Awadalla, setting out their plans for government. Radio Omdurman would later that morning also broadcast the names of the members of the new Council of Ministers, who had been agreed on 23 May in a meeting between Awadalla and the 6 key officers.

Whilst the composition of the ruling Revolutionary Command Council had been planned in advance, during the course of the day the council's membership was expanded. Whilst his fellow Free Officers were visiting key Army units and Security organisations to ensure their loyalty to the new regime, Nimeiry met with two members of the Free Officers who had voted against the coup at the Officers April meeting; Lt. Col. Babikir al-Nur and Maj. Abu al-Qasim Hashim. Both had their respective power bases, with al-Nur being the highest-ranking officer associated with the Sudanese Communist Party, and the latter maintaining key links with civilian Arab nationalists and Nasserists. Nimeiry, without consulting with the other coup plotters, decided to bring both individuals into the new government in order to expand its support base. Another officer associated with the communist party, Hashem al Atta, was also brought into the new council. The new council would therefore be composed of not only those who had implemented the coup, but also representatives of the majority block of the Free Officers Movement; which had opposed the coup in April.

References

See also
1989 Sudanese coup d'état
1969 cop d’état related medals

1960s coups d'état and coup attempts
Coup d'etat
Arab nationalism in Sudan
Arab nationalist rebellions
First Sudanese Civil War
May 1969 events in Africa
Military coups in Sudan
Nasserism
Socialism in Sudan